ZUMA Press is an US independent press agency and wire service that provides editorial photography services. It was founded in 1993 by photojournalist Scott McKiernan, with a global staff of over 50, covering news, sports, and entertainment events worldwide.

The agency represents more than 2,100 photographers as well as a collection of over 100 newspaper archives worldwide including those of Daily Mail, El Universal, The Daily Telegraph (London), Toronto Star, Los Angeles Daily News, San Antonio Express-News, Sacramento Bee, St. Petersburg Times, and Palm Beach Post. The company also represents picture agencies Action Images, DPA, EFE, EPA, and Gamma.

The company, its photographers and its DOUBLEtruck magazine have received awards including those from Pictures of the Year International and World Press Photo.

ZUMA is headquartered in San Clemente, California, with major bureaus in Hollywood, London and New York, as well as other locations worldwide.

References

External links 

Photo archives in the United States
Photojournalism organizations
Mass media companies established in 1993
Photography companies of the United States
Stock photography
American journalism organizations
Photo agencies